Kids These Days is an American discussion series that aired on Lifetime Cable in the morning Monday through Friday from 1996 to 1998.

The series discussed issues on parenting, children and teenagers. The subjects included safety at home and at school, childhood fears, kids and divorce, single parents, daycare, dealing with death, and parent-teacher relations.

References

1996 American television series debuts
1998 American television series endings
Lifetime (TV network) original programming
Television series about children